Porela vitulina is a moth of the  family Lasiocampidae. It is known from Australia, including New South Wales, Queensland and Victoria.

The wingspan is about 40 mm for males and 60 mm for females. Adults are white with brown markings. The thorax is white and hairy, with black markings.

The larvae have been recorded feeding on the foliage of various Casuarinaceae species.

References

Lasiocampidae
Moths described in 1805